Bridget Ikin is a New Zealand film producer who has lived and worked in Australia since 1990.

Early life and education 
Ikin was born in Lower Hutt, New Zealand. She took a BA in English literature from the University of Auckland, followed by an MA from London University.

Career 
Ikin opened her film production company, Hibiscus Films, in the early 1980s in New Zealand. She was a member of NZ Women in Film and Television, lobbying for support for women filmmakers.

She moved to Australia in 1990. From 1996 to 2000, as head of SBS Independent she commissioned more than 400 hours of programming. She served as feature film evaluation manager at the Film Finance Corporation (now Screen Australia) from 2005 to 2006 and was a board member of the South Australian Film Corporation for many years from 2007.

Ikin is a member of the Academy of Motion Picture Arts and Sciences.

Filmography 

 Talkback (1988) – producer
 Kitchen Sink (1989) – producer
 An Angel at My Table (1990) – producer
Crush (1992) – producer
 Floating Life (1996) – producer
 Walking on Water (2002) – executive producer
 The Tracker (2002) – executive producer
 Australian Rules (2002) – executive producer
 Look Both Ways (2005) – producer
 My Year Without Sex (2009) – producer
 Art + Soul (2010) documentary series – producer
 Sherpa (2015) – producer
 The Rehearsal (2016) – producer
 The Woman and the Car (2018) – producer
 It All Started With a Stale Sandwich (2019) – executive producer

Awards and recognition 
Ikin was awarded an honorary Doctor of Arts by the Australian Film and Television School in 2018.

References

External links 

 Hibiscus Films
 Felix Media website
 

Living people
Year of birth missing (living people)
People from Lower Hutt
University of Auckland alumni
Alumni of the University of London
New Zealand film producers
New Zealand women film producers